Nesoeme kuscheli is a species of beetle in the family Cerambycidae, the only species in the genus Nesoeme.

References

Xystrocerini
Monotypic beetle genera